The roof of fourth ventricle is the dorsal surface of the fourth ventricle.

It corresponds to the ventral surface of the cerebellum.

The upper portion of the roof is formed by the cerebellum.
The roof of ventricle is diamond shaped and can be divided into superior and inferior parts.
The superior part or cranial part is formed by superior cerebellar peduncles and superior medullary velum.

Additional images

References 

Brainstem